Payyampally  is a village in Wayanad district in the state of Kerala, India.

Demographics
 India census, Payyampally had a population of 12391 with 6276 males and 6115 females. 'Kuruva Island' the well known tourist place is situated in Payyampally. St Catherine's HSS, Govt. Higher Secondary School Arattuthara, Mary Matha Arts & Science College and St. Patrick's English Medium School are the main Educational institutions near Payyampally. The well known temple 'Valliyoor Kavu' is just 2 km away also 'Koodalkadavu' the joining point of Mananthavady river and Panamaram river is at Payyampally. The first migration in Wayanad is said to be took place at Payyampally in the years 1929-30 by Late. Mr. Devassya Kudakkachira. Tribes of Wayanad like Kurichiya, Pulaya, Adiya, Paniya and Kuruma are the majority population of Payyampally Village, In these Kurichiyas were the 'Army of Pazhassi Raja' against British.

Transportation
Payyampally can be accessed from Mananthavady or Kalpetta. The Periya ghat road connects Mananthavady to Kannur and Thalassery.  The Thamarassery mountain road connects Calicut with Kalpetta. The Kuttiady mountain road connects Vatakara with Kalpetta and Mananthavady. The Palchuram mountain road connects Kannur and Iritty with Mananthavady. The road from Nilambur to Ooty is also connected to Wayanad through the village of Meppadi.

The nearest railway station is at Mysore and the nearest airports are Kozhikode International Airport-120 km, Bengaluru International Airport-290 km, and   Kannur International Airport, 58 km.

See also 
 Mananthavady 
 Thondernad
 Vellamunda
 Nalloornad
Thavinjal
Vimala Nagar
Anjukunnu
Panamaram
Tharuvana
Kallody
Oorpally
Valat
Thrissilery

References

Villages in Wayanad district
Mananthavady Area